Henri Privat-Livemont (1861–1936) was an artist born in Schaerbeek, Brussels, Belgium. 

He is best known for his Art Nouveau posters. From 1883 to 1889, he worked and studied in the studios of Lemaire, Lavastre & Duvignaud. He, with Lemaire, created the decor of the Theatre Français as well as the Hôtel de Ville, Paris. He later moved back to Brussels, and worked on theaters and casinos there.

In 1897, he worked on the poster for the Brussels International Exposition (1897). The posters for Absinthe Robette and the Casino de Cabourg were published in Les Maîtres de l'Affiche.

See also
 Poster

References

1861 births
1936 deaths
People from Schaerbeek
Belgian illustrators
Art Nouveau illustrators
Belgian poster artists